The T-X (referred to as the Terminatrix in some appearances until other terminatrix (female terminators) appeared) is the name of a fictional cyborg assassin who appears in the Terminator franchise. The T-X model is a gynoid assassin and infiltrator. The character was introduced as the main antagonist in the 2003 film Terminator 3: Rise of the Machines, portrayed by Kristanna Loken. The T-X has the ability to assume the appearance of other characters; therefore, several other cast members occasionally portrayed the T-X throughout the film. This ability to shapeshift is similar to that of the T-1000, the main antagonist of Terminator 2: Judgment Day. Like other Terminators the T-X has the ability to scan DNA from blood samples that it puts on it’s tongue

Concept and design

The T-X was designed by Stan Winston and his studio team, where it was considered particularly challenging to design, as the script required a character capable of holding its own against the original Terminator, known in the film as a T-101. Originally, the T-X's endoskeleton was meant to convey an androgynous shape which would permit the android to assume the superficial traits of both men and women, though later designs veered on it being more feminine. The final, approved T-X design was done by Aaron Sims, who designed it entirely on computer through a mixture of Photoshop and 3D software. The T-X endoskeleton was painted chrome black, in order to differentiate it from the silver sheen of the T-101 endoskeleton, and fitted with blue running lights rather than the original's red. John Rosengrant later stated that the individual parts of the T-X endoskeleton were hard coated, sanded and polished through machines, resulting in a mathematically perfect model, unlike the endoskeleton in The Terminator, which was sculpted by hand and lacked symmetry.

The T-X is designed to not only terminate humans, but also rogue Terminators reprogrammed by the Resistance, an "anti-terminator terminator" as stated by John Connor. It is a composite of the T-800 and T-1000, combining the former's solid endoskeleton covered with the latter's liquid metal "mimetic polyalloy", allowing it to take the shape of any humanoid it touches. Because it is only coated in this material, it is possible to remove it from the endoskeleton using immensely strong magnetic force, such as that from a cyclic particle accelerator. Having a solid endoskeleton did solve some of the T-1000's problems, namely being deformed by temperature extremes and explosives while also lacking built-in ranged weaponry. However, the endoskeleton makes the T-X less flexible than its T-1000 predecessor, in that the T-X does not have the ability to liquefy and assume forms in innovative and surprising ways, including fitting through narrow openings, morphing its arms into solid metal tools or bladed weapons, walking through prison bars, or flattening itself. The T-X contains a large arsenal of advanced weapons from the future, including plasma cannons and flamethrowers - though it is strong enough to impale a human through the chest with its bare hand.  This was the first time that Skynet was able to send more advanced weapons back in time, as the inability of anything not covered in human flesh to go back in time prevented it, but T-X's hybrid design of a solid endoskeleton with a shapeshifting liquid metal surface enabled this workaround.  

Although the official novelization of Terminator 2 expanded the origin of the T-1000 and reveals it had onboard nanotechnology (and programmable memory) that was capable of scanning the molecular structure of anything the T-1000 touched, the T-X has a built-in supply of more advanced nanobots in its fingers, which it can inject into other machines (even a less-advanced android), giving it remote control. An onboard plasma reactor powers all of the T-X's systems.

Loken had to gain over 15 pounds of muscle to portray the T-X. She was also trained by mime coach Thorsten Heinze, a long-time collaborator of famous mime Marcel Marceau, to develop a robotic style of moving.

Film appearance
The T-X is the main antagonist in the 2003 film Terminator 3: Rise of the Machines. 

It was sent back in time by Skynet to eliminate John Connor's future lieutenants and ensure that Skynet will rise without any interference. Among her targets is John's future wife, Kate Brewster, and her father, Robert, who is Skynet's primary creator. The T-X arrives outside of a store, kills a woman, steals her clothes, car, and identity. It then kills a police officer that pulls her over, and locates and terminates three of its targets.

When it tracks down Kate Brewster in a veterinarian hospital, it locates John Connor and makes him its primary target. As it interrogates Kate, a T-101, which was sent to protect the T-X's targets, arrives and rescues John and Kate. After a chase, the T-X kills Kate's fiancé and impersonates him. It almost succeeds in killing Kate, but John and the Terminator arrive and rescue her. The T-X chases them through a cemetery, but fails to kill them, with the Terminator destroying its plasma cannon with a missile launcher. Unbeknownst to the T-X, John Connor personally coins the machine as a "Terminatrix" based on it having a dominatrix figure.

Proceeding with its secondary mission, the T-X infiltrates Cyber Research Systems and activates the division's weaponized machines, which kill most of the employees. The T-X succeeds in killing Robert Brewster and ensuring Skynet's rise. After a fight with the T-101, it pursues John and Kate to Crystal Peak, a military base. Just as it prepares to kill them, the T-101 arrives in a helicopter and crashes into the T-X. The T-X, with her endoskeleton broken in half and revealed, crawls and pursues John. The T-101 grabs it and puts his last hydrogen fuel cell into the mouth of the T-X, destroying both of them. Though it failed to kill John and Kate, the T-X succeeded in securing Skynet's rise.

Literature
The 2003 comic series Terminator 3: Eyes of the Rise depicts the events of Terminator 3: Rise of the Machines from the perspective of the T-X, detailing how it was prepared for its mission before being sent back in time, what its thoughts were during the events of the film, additionally revealing that the T-X survives the film's conclusion in its liquid metal form, albeit no longer being able to take solid form due to a lack of solid material, bar forming a face after John Connor and Kate Brewster have left their bunker to smile at the beginning of Judgment Day.

In the 2004 novel Terminator Hunt, a second T-X is trained by captured resistance members for a jump to the 1960s where she will track the Connor family for the next forty years. A captured resistance soldier, Paul Keeley, is tricked into helping make the T-X more human. An implant in his brain causes him to think that the T-X is a girl named Eliza, and his interaction with her helps her learn how to be human. The resistance captures the T-X and rescues Keeley. But Eliza uses the implant to make Keeley think they have been captured by a rogue government, and he frees her. Overburdened with guilt, Keeley convinces John and Katherine Connor to give him another chance to capture Eliza. Through the implant, Paul discovers the training facility she has escaped to, and Eliza is again captured by the resistance and reprogrammed to serve it.

In the crossover comic Superman vs. The Terminator: Death to the Future (2000), there is a female Terminator called Terminatrix. However, it is never mentioned if it is a T-X or not as the comic predates Terminator 3: Rise of the Machines.

See also
List of female supervillains
Nanotechnology in fiction
Time travel
Human enhancement

References

External links 
 T-X on IMDb

Terminator (franchise) characters
Fictional female assassins
Fictional gynoids
Fictional artificial intelligences
Fictional aviators
Fictional mass murderers
Female supervillains
Fictional characters with superhuman strength
Fictional characters who can move at superhuman speeds
Fictional characters with accelerated healing
Fictional characters with superhuman durability or invulnerability
Fictional shapeshifters
Fictional super soldiers
Fictional technopaths
Film characters introduced in 2003
Fictional soldiers
Science fiction weapons
Action film characters
Time travelers
Female characters in film
Action film villains
Film supervillains
Robot supervillains